Phunom is a village in Tiddim Township, Chin State, Myanmar.

It is located in the west of the country, near the border with India.

References

External links
 Weather forecast
 Chin, Tedim, Phunom
 Weather Forecast

Populated places in Chin State